Zdeněk Košta (born 30 May 1923) is a Czech former cyclist. He competed in the men's sprint event at the 1952 Summer Olympics.

References

External links
 

1923 births
Living people
Czechoslovak male cyclists
Czech male cyclists
Olympic cyclists of Czechoslovakia
Cyclists at the 1952 Summer Olympics